The Petralona Cave also Cave of the Red Stones, a karst formation, is located at  above sea-level on the western foot of Mount Katsika, about  east of the village of Petralona, about  south-east of Thessaloniki city on the Chalkidiki peninsula, Greece. The site came to public attention when in 1960 a fossilized archaic human skull was found. The cave had been discovered accidentally only a year earlier (1959) after erosion had left clefts in the rock. "Bejeweled" with impressive stalactite and stalagmite formations and holding an abundance of fossils, the cave soon attracted geologists and paleontologists. After decades of excavations the cave is open to the public and scientific work is documented and presented in an adjacent archaeological museum.

The cave's most prominent fossil specimen, since known among paleoanthropologists as the "Petralona Skull".

The on-site Anthropological Museum of Petralona displays a selection of the objects that have been found in the cave.

Discovery 

The cave was discovered accidentally in 1959 by Fillipos Chatzaridis, a local shepherd who was looking for a spring. In his effort to find a water source he found a small cleft on the slopes of Mount Katsika. Two men were lowered down and later described a large number of chambers and corridors, totaling 8 to 10 meters high with rich and beautiful formations of speleothems (stalactites and stalagmites).

The cave developed during the Mesozoic (Jurassic) limestone, its sediments are divided into several stratigraphic levels. "The rock formations resemble giant cactus, pink pearls, sturdy columns or delicate curtains, and in several places water ponds are fed by stalactite material. The first research of 1959 was undertaken by the Greek speleologist Ioannis Petrocheilos. He found numerous bones of animals, many of them covered with cave coral.

Petralona skull 

The Petralona skull according to  Aris Poulianos, head of the excavation team since 1965, 
was found by a villager,  Christos Sariannidis, in 1960.
Its lower jaw is missing and it was  "encrusted by brown calcite soon after the death of the individual" 

Poulanios (1981) estimated the age of the skull at around 210,000 years. He announced that "the date was based on analyses of the cave's stratigraphy and the accumulated sediments".

Poulianos concluded that the skull represented a previously unknown hominin genus, unrelated to Homo erectus, and even outside of Homo, introducing the genus name Archanthropus, and the trinomial Archanthropus europaeus petraloniensis for the Petralona skull itself.
Independent paleanthropologists have tended to classify the skull as either Homo erectus, Homo heidelbergensis or Homo neanderthalensis.

Poulianos claims have been a continuing cause of controversy since,  
his conclusions being in conflict with mainstream models of the speciation of genus Homo and its
early dispersal.

Poulianos complained that  excavations on the site were delayed and/or had to be discontinued several times, first in 1967 and the following years in relation to the Greek coup d'état, and again in 1983, when the Ministry of Culture declined to re-issue the excavation concession until "in 1997 the Anthropological Association of Greece, after 15 years of trials, was justified by the Supreme Court and was ordered the continuation of its works in the cave." 
Poulianos repeatedly accused the Greek government of conspiring to suppress his discoveries, as in 2012 excavation rights were revoked again.

In 1981, the age of the Petralona skull deduced by Poulianos was investigated and the protocol published in the journal Nature. The scientists involved used electron spin resonance measurements of the calcite encrustation and of bone fragments, and dated the age of the skull to between 240,000 and 160,000 years old. 

Poulianos dates the fossil stratigraphically, claiming an age of the relevant layer of about 670,000 years old, also  based on electron spin resonance measurements. 
Other researchers point out, that contextual animal fossils "found with it are known elsewhere from approximately 350,000 years ago". 
In 1987 researchers announced that the cranium cannot be older than 620,000 years, based on palaeo-magnetic and mineral magnetic studies of the cave's sediments.

Layer 10 
In 1992 an international team published its results of a uranium-series dating analysis of the small cavern, called "The Mausoleum", where the skull was allegedly found and the sediments, named "Layer 10" by Poulianos. The results confirm earlier findings "that the whole of layer 10 represents a long time span, from about 160 ka to more than 350 ka". The minimum age refers to the brown calcite layer, which covered and cemented the hominid skull to the wall. The fossil encrustation is insufficient to date it by alpha-spectrometric, uranium-series methods, yet its minimum age was concluded to be also 160.000 years.

Today, most academics who have analyzed the Petralona remains classify the hominid as Homo erectus. However, the Archanthropus of Petralona has also been classified as a Homo heidelbergensis, Neanderthal (Homo sapiens neanderthalensis) and as an early generic class of Homo sapiens. A. Poulianos, on the other hand, believes that the Petralona cranium is derived from an independent class of hominids unrelated to Homo erectus.

Runnels and van Andel summarise the situation as follows:
"The only known hominid fossil in Greece that may be relevant is the Petralona hominid, found by chance in 1960 in a deep cavern in the Chalkidiki. Controversy surrounds the interpretation of this cranium, and it has been variously classified as Homo erectus, as a classic Neanderthal (Homo neanderthalensis), and as an early representative of Homo sapiens in a generalized sense. The consensus among today's paleoanthropologists [is centered around the idea] that the cranium belongs to an archaic hominid distinguished from Homo erectus and both the classic Neanderthals and anatomically modern humans. Whatever the final classification may be, the cranium has been provisionally dated to ca. 200–400 thousand years old and it is thus possible that the Petralona hominid is a representative of the lineage responsible for the Thessalian Lower Paleolithic sites."

The Anthropological Association of Greece has continued to announce new findings in the cave, such as 4 isolated teeth, then two  year old pre-human skeletons, and a great number of fossils of various species.

The fossils have been preserved at the Geology School of the Aristotle University of Thessaloniki since 1960.

Fossil fauna 
Animal fossils of numerous species were found in the cave:

Fish 
 indeterminate species

Amphibians 
 Bufo bufo (Linnaeus) (common toad)
 Pelobates fuscus Laurenti (a species of toad)

Reptiles 
 Testudo graeca Linnaeus (spur-thighed tortoise)
 Testudo sp. (giant)
 Varanus intermedius Bolkay
 Lacerta trilineata (Betriaga) (Balkan green lizard)
 Lacerta viridis (Laurenti) (European green lizard)
 Lacerta sp. (small) (lizards)
 Ophidia indet. (snakes)

Birds 
 Anser anser Linnaeus (greylag goose)
 Aythya ferina Linnaeus (common pochard)
 Fulica atra Linnaeus (eurasian coot)
 Buthierax pouliani Kretzoi (extinct species of eagle)
 Falco tinnunculus Linnaeus (common kestrel)
 Alectoris sp. (species of partridges)
 Alectoris graeca mediterranea Maurer-Chauvire' (rock partridge)
 Perdix jurcsaki (Kretzoi) (a species of partridge)
 Scolopacidae indet. (family of waders or shorebirds – sandpipers, curlew, snipe and other associated species)
 Larus sp. (a genus of gulls)
 Columba oenas ssp. (stock dove)
 Columba livia ssp. (rock pigeon)
 Columba palumbus Linnaeus (common wood pigeon)
 Strix aluco Linnaeus (tawny owl)
 Glaucidium Linnaeus (pygmy owls)
 Bubo sp. (horned owl and associated species)
 Corvus corax Linnaeus (common raven)
 Pyrrhocorax graculus vetus Kretzoi (alpine chough)
 Turdus sp. (a genus of true thrushes)
 Lanius minor Gmelin (lesser grey shrike)
 Prunella collaris Scopoli (alpine accentor)
 Passeriformes indet. I, II

Mammals

Insectivores
 Erinaceus europaeus praeglacialis Brunner (preglaciation European hedgehog )
 Sorex minutus Linnaeus (Eurasian pygmy shrew)
 Sorex runtonensis (Hinton)
 Pachyura etrusca (Savi)
 Talpa minuta Freudenberg (a genus of moles)

Primates 
 Archanthropus europaeus petraloniensis or Homo Heidelbergensis Α. Poulianos

Chiroptera (bats) 
 Rhinolophus sp. indét. I, II
 Rhinolophus ferrumequinum topali Kretzoi (a subspecies of greater horseshoe bat)
 Rhinolophus mehelyi Matschie (Mehely's horseshoe bat)
 Rhinolophus hipposideros Bechstein (lesser horseshoe bat)
 Miniopterus schreibersii Kuhl (common bent-wing bat)
 Myotis sp. indét. I, II (genus of mouse-eared bats)
 Myotis myotis Borkhausen (greater mouse-eared bat)
 Myotis blythi oxygnathus Monticelli
 Myotis blythi ssp.
 Myotis emarginatus Geoffroy (Geoffroy's bat)
 Myotis daubentonii (Kuhl) (Daubenton's bat)
 Vespertilio murinus Linnaeus (particoloured bat)
 Hypsugo savii Bonaparte (Savi's pipistrelle)
 Eptesicus sp. (a genus of bats)
 Nyctalus noctula (Schreber) (common noctule)
 Pipistrellus (?) sp. (a genus of bats)

Lagomorpha 
 Lepus terraerubrae (Kretzoi)
 Oryctolagus sp. (European rabbit)

Rodents 
 Urocitellus primigenius daphnae Kretzoi (extinct species of Urocitellus or ground squirrel)
 Hystrix sp. (a genus of porcupines)
 Gliridae indet. (a genus of dormouse)
 Dryomimus eliomyoides arisi Kretzoi
 Parasminthus brevidens Kretzoi
 Spalax chalkidikae Kretzoi
 Apodemus mystacinus crescendus Kretzoi
 Mus synanthropus (Mus (Budamys) synanthropus) Kretzoi (a subspecies of Mus)
 Allocricetus bursae simplex Kretzoi (a subspecies of hamsters – see Allocricetulus)
 Lagurus transiens Janossy (a species of Lagurus – voles, lemmings, and related species)
 Eolagurus argyropuloi zazhighini Ν. Poulianos (a genus of rodents)
 Arvicola cantiana Heinrich (a species of vole)
 Microtus praeguentheri Kretzoi (a species of vole)

Carnivorans 
  † Canis lupus mosbachensis Soergel (prehistoric wolf species)
  † Cuon priscus Thenius (Early Middle Pleistocene dhole or wild dog)
  † Xenocyon lycaonoides Kretzoi
  † Meles meles atavus ? (Kormos) (primitive European badger)
  † Ursus stehlini ? (Kretzoi)
  † Ursus deningeri Reichenau
  † Crocuta petralonae Kurten
  † Pachycrocuta brevirostris Aymard (a subspecies of prehistoric hyenas)
  † Pachycrocuta perrieri Croizet & Jobert (a subspecies of prehistoric hyenas)
  † Panthera leo fossilis Reichenau (primitive cave lion)
  † Panthera gombaszoegensis Kretzoi (European jaguar)
  † Panthera pardus Linnaeus (leopard)
  † Felis silvestris hamadryas ? (Kurten) (species of wild cat)
  † Homotherium sp. (close to the sabertooth tiger)
  † Vulpes praeglacialis - (Kormos) a true vulpes fox

 Proboscidea 
 Elephas sp. (genus of elephants)

 Perissodactyla 

 Equus mosbachensis (Reichenau)
 Equus hydruntinus ssp. (European ass)
 Equus stenonis petraloniensis Tsoukala
 Stephanorhinus hundsheimensis Toula (a species of Stephanorhinus – rhinoceros)

 Artiodactyla 
 Sus scrofa ssp.(wild boar)
 Dama dama ssp. (fallow deer)
 Cervus elaphus ssp. (red deer)
 Praemegaceros verticornis ? (Dawkins) (a genus of large deer – see Megaloceros verticornis)
 Capra ibex macedonica Sickenberg (a subspecies of alpine ibex)
 Bison schoetensacki'' (Freudenberg) (European woodland bison]])

References

External links 

 Homepage of Cave
 The Petralona Cave and Anthropological Museum

Caves of Greece
Landforms of Central Macedonia
Landforms of Chalkidiki
Paleoanthropological sites
Show caves in Greece